The Mother of Dartmoor is a 1916 British silent drama film directed by George Loane Tucker and starring Elisabeth Risdon, Bertram Burleigh and Enid Bell.

Plot summary
A mother testifies against her own poacher son and he is sent to prison.

Cast
 Elisabeth Risdon as Avesa Pomeroy 
 Bertram Burleigh as Ives Pomeroy 
 Enid Bell as Jill Wicket  
 George Bellamy as Matthew Northmore  
 Sydney Fairbrother as Mrs. Bolt  
 Frank Stanmore as Sammy Bolt 
 Hubert Willis as Moleskin

References

Bibliography
 Goble, Alan. The Complete Index to Literary Sources in Film. Walter de Gruyter, 1999.

External links
 

1916 films
British drama films
British silent feature films
Films directed by George Loane Tucker
1916 drama films
Films based on British novels
Films set in England
Films set in Devon
First National Pictures films
British black-and-white films
1910s English-language films
1910s British films
Silent drama films